Voices was an American R&B vocal girl group from Los Angeles that was active during the late 1980s until the early 1990s. The group consisted of members Monique Wilson, Arike Rice, sisters LaPetra and LaToya McMoore, and then unknown twins Tia and Tamera Mowry.

The group's only album, Just the Beginning... debuted in 1992 on Zoo Entertainment. The album featured Jo Marie Payton as a guest vocalist and Berry Gordy, Jr. was among the composers. Just the Beginning... features songs such as "Yeah, Yeah, Yeah!" (the group's most successful single), "M.M.D.R.N.F. (My Mama Didn't Raise No Fool)", and "Cloudy with a Chance of Tears". The album was commercially unsuccessful. Arike Rice became a member of the group Before Dark eight years later. Tia and Tamera's mom Darlene removed the twins from the group after a disagreement with management. Voices and other urban acts on Zoo's roster were also overlooked in favor of its popular alternative rock groups, who took up most of the label's focus.

Discography

Albums

Singles

References

African-American musical groups
American girl groups
American contemporary R&B musical groups
Musical groups established in 1992
Musical groups disestablished in 1993